SC Eisenstadt (Croatian: NK Željezno) was an Austrian association football club based in Eisenstadt. Established in 1907, it played in the Austrian Football Bundesliga. It folded in 2008. In 2018 SC Eisenstadt started again in the lowest league (2. Klasse Nord) in Burgenland.

They last played in the Bundesliga in the 1986-1987 season.

Honours
Mitropa Cup (1): 1984
Austrian Football First League (1): 1980
Austrian Regional League East (2): 1967, 1971

Past managers

External links
 Official website
 Historical Austrian league results
 Historical German league results 

Association football clubs established in 1907
Defunct football clubs in Austria
Football clubs from former German territories
SC Eisenstadt
Association football clubs disestablished in 2008
SC Eisenstadt
SC Eisenstadt
SC Eisenstadt